Wilmington University (WilmU) is a private university with its main campus in Wilmington Manor, Delaware, with a New Castle street address. It was founded in 1968 as Wilmington College by educator Dr. Donald E. Ross. As of 2016, the university served a total student body of 20,522 undergraduate and postgraduate students in nearly 100 degree and certificate programs. The university's programs are offered at its main campus in historic New Castle as well as at six additional campuses in Delaware, several partnership locations in New Jersey, and a single partnership location in northeastern Maryland.

History
Wilmington University was founded just outside historic New Castle, Delaware, in 1968 by Dr. Donald E. Ross, who served as the institution's president until 1977. The school began with a charter class of 194 students in 1968; between 1979 and 2006, the university grew to more than 10,000 students under the leadership of president Dr. Audrey K. Doberstein. Doberstein was inducted into the Hall of Fame of Delaware Women in 2011 in recognition of her contributions to Wilmington University and the community.  The university now offers graduate and doctoral degrees, and serves more than 20,000 students enrolled annually in online and on-campus classes at campuses in three states.

Founded as Wilmington College, the institution officially became Wilmington University on September 10, 2007, after the approval of the board of trustees and the Middle States Commission on Higher Education. The name was changed to reflect the emphasis on undergraduate and postgraduate degree programs.

Campuses

Main campus 
The main campus is in Wilmington Manor, a census-designated place in unincorporated New Castle County, Delaware. The campus has a "New Castle, Delaware" postal address but it is outside of the New Castle city limits. It is along U.S. Route 13. The main campus hosts more than 80 degree programs at the undergraduate, graduate, and doctoral levels. In addition to classroom facilities, the main campus in New Castle features the Pratt Student center, opened in 2013 after an extensive renovation of a former university gymnasium. New Castle is also home to the Wilson Graduate Center, where the most of the university's graduate and doctoral degree programs are offered in northern Delaware.

Site locations 
 Delaware

New Castle area: the Graduate Center is in an unincorporated area
Brandywine: In an unincorporated area
Athletic Complex
Dover
Dover Air Force Base
William A. Carter Partnership Center (Georgetown)

New Jersey

Rowan College at Burlington County
Cumberland County College
Joint Base McGuire-Dix-Lakehurst, New Jersey
Rowan College at Gloucester County
Salem Community College
Mercer County Community College
Camden County College

Academics 
Wilmington University offers nearly 100 degree and certificate programs across its seven academic colleges and 14 campus locations throughout Delaware, New Jersey, and Maryland, as well as dozens of academic minors and concentrations that specialize its degree offerings.

College of Arts & Sciences 
Specializing in a traditional, liberal arts education, the College of Arts & Sciences features undergraduate programs in liberal studies, environmental science, and communication, with minors in art, drama, history, mathematics, and natural science. The college expanded in 2017 to include a graduate program in Teaching English to Speakers of Other Languages (TESOL).

College of Education
Accredited by the National Council for Accreditation of Teacher Education (NCATE) in 2007, the College of Education is one of the largest academic colleges at Wilmington University and offers teacher preparation programs that range from elementary education to specialized secondary education fields, school leadership, innovation, and much more. At any given time, there are more than 1,000 Wilmington University education students performing supervised field work, such as student teaching instruction, throughout Delaware and the wider Philadelphia metropolitan area.

College of Business
The College of Business, accredited by the International Assembly for Collegiate Business Education, offers 10 undergraduate, 4 graduate, and 1 doctoral program in fields like business administration, accounting, finance, economics, marketing, and analytics. Certificate programs, as well as six concentrations, are also offered. The College of Business maintains an active chapter of the Sigma Beta Delta international honor society for students in business, management, and administration programs.

Notable faculty
 Jennifer Cohan, Delaware Department of Transportation Secretary
 Henry Milligan, actor, engineer, and professional boxer

College of Health Professions 
The College of Health Professions is unique among universities in the region, in that its undergraduate programs are offered only as "completion" programs for students who have already attended a two-year nursing program and become a Registered Nurse. The college, which has full accreditation by the Commission on Collegiate Nursing Education (CCNE) for its undergraduate and graduate programs, enrolled its first class of RN-to-BSN students in 1986. In 1993, the university approved the addition of a Master of Science in Nursing program, which today features three distinct concentrations that fit students' unique needs. In 2005, an undergraduate completion program in Allied Health was approved, giving students access to one of the fastest-growing academic and professional practice areas in the health professions. The College of Health Professions also offers a Doctor of Nursing Practice program.

College of Social & Behavioral Sciences
With degree programs ranging from political science and legal studies to clinical mental health counseling and organizational dynamics, the College of Social & Behavioral Sciences is one of the largest colleges at Wilmington University. Many programs offered by the college are professionally accredited; the Bachelor of Science program in legal studies has been approved by the American Bar Association (ABA), while the college's graduate program in clinical mental health counseling has achieved accreditation by the  Council for Accreditation of Counseling and Related Educational Programs (CACREP). Students in the College of Social & Behavioral Sciences often participate in the CAP co-op program, which offers academic credit in exchange for a semester-long internship relevant to the student's course of study.

Notable faculty
 Dr. Lem Burnham – former director and vice president for player & employee development at the National Football League (NFL), former Philadelphia Eagles defensive end, current vice president for the Philadelphia chapter of NFL Alumni.

College of Technology
The College of Technology was awarded in 2011 by the National Security Agency as a National Center of Academic Excellence in Information Assurance Education (CAE/IAE). The CAE/IAE designation from the NSA applies to the College of Technology undergraduate Computer and Network Security degree program and the Information Systems Technologies, Information Assurance graduate program.

College of Online & Experiential Learning
The College of Online and Experiential Learning houses all of Wilmington University's more than 95 online degree programs, concentrations, and certificates. The college serves 41 percent of the student body, as of 2016, with distance education programs in business, education, technology, and many other fields. Online programs at Wilmington University have received recognition from several major publications. U.S. News & World Report ranks the online program 161st nationally.

School of Law
In October, 2022, Wilmington announced that it would open a law school beginning with the 2023 academic year, naming Phillip J. Closius, formerly Dean of University of Baltimore School of Law and the University of Toledo College of Law as its first Dean.

Athletics 

Wilmington University's athletic teams are known as the Wildcats, and are represented by the school's mascot, named "Wiley D. Wildcat." The university's teams compete in NCAA Division II and the Central Atlantic Collegiate Conference for all sports.

Athletic facilities
Athletic teams at the university are served by the Wilmington University Athletic Complex in Bear, Delaware. Opened in 2013, this sports complex includes outdoor fields as well as an indoor, multi-purpose playing court for basketball and volleyball. The complex provides athletic facilities and a home field to the men's and women's basketball and soccer teams as well as the women's lacrosse and volleyball teams.

Notable alumni
 Anthony Allison, professional soccer player
 Paul Bechly, American chemical engineer
 Hugh T. Broomall, major general, United States Air Force
 Richard C. Cathcart, former house majority leader, Delaware House of Representatives
 Bushra Gohar, Pakistani-Pashtun politician
 Thomas P. Gordon, county executive, New Castle County, Delaware
 Ruth Briggs King, member, Delaware House of Representatives
 Trinidad Navarro, Insurance Commissioner of Delaware
 Charles Potter Jr., member, Delaware House of Representatives
 David D. Rudolph, member, Maryland House of Delegates
 John C. Sigler, former president, National Rifle Association
 Terry R. Spence, former speaker, Delaware House of Representatives
 Peter C. Schwartzkopf, speaker, Delaware House of Representatives
 Francis D. Vavala, adjutant general, State of Delaware
 R. Thomas Wagner Jr., Delaware's auditor of accounts

References

External links

 Official website

 
1968 establishments in Delaware
Education in New Castle County, Delaware
Educational institutions established in 1968
Private universities and colleges in Delaware